"It's Been a Great Afternoon" is a song written and recorded by American country music artist Merle Haggard.  It was released in July 1978 as the second single from the album I'm Always on a Mountain When I Fall.  The song reached #2 on the Billboard Hot Country Singles & Tracks chart.

Chart performance

References

1978 singles
1978 songs
Merle Haggard songs
Songs written by Merle Haggard
MCA Records singles